Mr. Lonely is Bobby Vinton's tenth studio album, released in 1964. It was released right after the success of his fourth and final #1 US hit "Mr. Lonely," a 1962 song that was released as a single after its appearance on Bobby Vinton's Greatest Hits. Cover versions on this album include "Laughing on the Outside (Crying on the Inside)" and "I'll Never Smile Again". After the success of the single, Vinton released Bobby Vinton Sings for Lonely Nights, an album of songs devoted to the subject of loneliness.

Track listing

Personnel 
 Bob Morgan – producer
Robert Mersey – arranger, conductor ("Mr. Lonely")
Garry Sherman – arranger, conductor ("Always, Always (Yesterday's Love Song)")
Charles Calello – arranger, conductor ("Tina")
Burt Bacharach – arranger ("Forever Yours I Remain")
Stan Applebaum – arranger, conductor ("Life Goes On" and "Laughing on the Outside (Crying on the Inside)")
Bill Walker – arranger ("A Thing Called Sadness", "The Grass Is Always Greener", "I'll Never Smile Again" and "It's Better to Have Loved")

Charts 
Album – Billboard (North America)

Singles – Billboard (North America)

References 

1964 albums
Bobby Vinton albums
Epic Records albums
Albums arranged by Charles Calello
Albums conducted by Charles Calello
Albums arranged by Burt Bacharach